Roanne Bardsley is a Welsh television screenwriter, best known her work on the long-running Channel 4 soap opera Hollyoaks. She was originally from Lampeter, later moving to Liverpool.

Career
Following an apprenticeship, Bardsley became a storyliner for Hollyoaks, in 2012. Bardsley graduated to writing over 60 episodes on the series, starting in 2015. In 2018, she won Best Single Episode at the British Soap Awards. Later, she won the writer’s award for Best Long Running TV Series for Hollyoaks at the Writers’ Guild Awards 2020. Bardsley was also selected as one of the Edinburgh TV Festival's 'Ones To Watch'.

She has also written for prison drama Screw, Emmy-winning Netflix children's drama Free Rein and the supernatural thriller series The Rising for Sky Max.

References

External links
 

Living people
21st-century British women writers
21st-century Welsh women writers
British soap opera writers
British television writers
British women television writers
Welsh television writers
Women soap opera writers
Year of birth missing (living people)
People from Lampeter